KNEO (91.7 FM) is a Christian radio station licensed to Neosho, Missouri, serving the Joplin, Missouri area.  The station is owned by Sky High Broadcasting Corporation.

Programming
KNEO's programming includes Christian talk and teaching shows including; Truth for Life with Alistair Begg, Running to Win with Erwin Lutzer, Grace to You with John MacArthur, In Touch with Dr. Charles Stanley, and Thru the Bible with J. Vernon McGee, Insight for Living with Chuck Swindoll, Enjoying Everyday Life with Joyce Meyer, Focus On The Family, and Jay Sekulow Live.

History
KNEO began broadcasting in October 1986 and originally broadcast at 91.5 MHz, and operated only 12 hours a day running 380 watts from a 70-foot tower. The station began full-time operations the following year. In November 1994, KNEO's frequency was changed to 91.7 MHz and began running 2,760 watts from its current 340 foot tower. In 2002, following the technical failure of some of its equipment, KNEO's power was increased to 4,600 watts. In 2008, the station's power was increased to its present ERP of 14,000 watts.

References

External links
KNEO's official website

NEO
Radio stations established in 1986
1986 establishments in Missouri